Michael Groveman (born 1962) is an American businessman who served as the CEO of Bill Blass limited from 1990, to 2007. Before moving to Bill Blass, Groveman was a manager in the accounting firm of Ferro, Berdon and Company in New York. He has a B.A. in accounting from Long Island University C.W. Post. Groveman sold Bill Blass to NexCen Brands Inc. in 2007 for $70 million.

References

1962 births
People from Paramus, New Jersey
Living people
American chief executives of fashion industry companies
LIU Post alumni